The Canton of Dainville is a former canton situated in the department of the Pas-de-Calais and in the Nord-Pas-de-Calais region of northern France. It was disbanded following the French canton reorganisation which came into effect in March 2015. It had a total of 18,803 inhabitants (2012).

Geography 
The canton is organised around Dainville in the arrondissement of Arras. The altitude varies from 53m (Sainte-Catherine) to 145m (Acq) for an average altitude of 88m.

The canton comprised 10 communes:

Acq
Anzin-Saint-Aubin
Dainville
Duisans
Écurie
Étrun
Marœuil
Mont-Saint-Éloi
Roclincourt
Sainte-Catherine-lès-Arras

Population

See also
Cantons of Pas-de-Calais 
Communes of Pas-de-Calais 
Arrondissements of the Pas-de-Calais department

References

Dainville
2015 disestablishments in France
States and territories disestablished in 2015